Ismael Raul da Silva Miranda, known as just Ismael, is a Brazilian professional football defender.

External links
 

1983 births
Living people
Brazilian footballers
Sport Club Internacional players
Grêmio Esportivo Brasil players
Paysandu Sport Club players
Associação Atlética Portuguesa (Santos) players
Herfølge Boldklub players
HB Køge players
Sociedade Esportiva e Recreativa Caxias do Sul players
Brazilian expatriate footballers
Expatriate men's footballers in Denmark
Footballers from Porto Alegre
Association football fullbacks